Rehavia or Rechavia is an upscale Jerusalem neighborhood located between the city center and Talbiya.

Since its establishment in the 1920s, the area has always been associated with German-Jewish culture and tradition. The quarter remained an island of German culture and language long after the establishment of the State of Israel and up to this day through the Schocken library (by late German-Jewish editor Salman Schocken), the largest and most significant collection of German books in the country, is to be found in the neighborhood.

Name

The suburb received its name from Eliezer Yellin, its first inhabitant and one of its early architects, and was named after Moses' grandson, "Rehavia", a name also transliterated as "Rehabiah" in biblical context.

History

Rehavia was established on a large plot of land purchased in 1921 from the Greek Orthodox Church by the Palestine Land Development Company (PLDC) and the first house was completed in 1924. It was given the biblical name Rehavia. The area was known at the time by the Arab name of Ginzaria, a native Jerusalem plant, elsewhere spelled as Janjirieh. The Jewish National Fund (JNF) bought the land and commissioned the German-Jewish architect Richard Kauffmann to design a garden neighborhood. Kauffmann, who spelled the name of his project as Janziriah, created a typical Garden City neighbourhood, with gardens surrounding the houses and an orderly, but not too strict grid of streets and footpaths set in relation to the main boulevard cutting through the area, thus avoiding an excessive sense of symmetry. For legal reasons the land had to be transferred back to the PLDC in exchange for lands in the Jezreel Valley, but the JNF retained some real-estate in the neighborhood. The Gymnasia Rehavia high school, Yeshurun Synagogue, and the Jewish Agency building were built on this land, overlooking the Old City. Rehavia's general outline was modelled after the garden cities of Europe (especially Germany, e.g. the quarters of Dahlem or Grunewald in Berlin), while the architecture of the buildings shows an emphasis on the International Style popular at the time.

The first phase, called Rehavia Aleph, was bordered by King George Street to the east, Ramban Street to the south, Ussishkin Street to the west, and Keren Kayemet Street to the north. To preserve the quiet character, the neighborhood association allowed commercial businesses only on the two main roads at the neighborhood's edges. The roads open to traffic were deliberately built narrow, to keep them less busy and thus quieter. The main, tree-lined boulevard which bisected the neighborhood was open to pedestrian traffic only. Later expansion was primarily to the south, in the direction of Gaza Street.

The prime minister's official residence is "Aghion House", at No. 3 Balfour Street, on the corner with Smolenskin Street.

Demographics
When the Ethiopian emperor Haile Selassie was exiled from Ethiopia in 1936, he lived for a short time on Al-Harizi Street. Rehavia became known as a neighborhood of upper-class Ashkenazi Jews, home to professors and intellectuals, particularly émigrés from Germany. Many of the country's early leaders lived in Rehavia: David Ben-Gurion, Israel's first prime minister, who lived on Ben Maimon street; Zionist leader Arthur Ruppin; Menachem Ussishkin, head of the Jewish National Fund; Golda Meir, Israel's fourth prime minister; Daniel Auster, the first Jewish mayor of Jerusalem, and philosophers Hugo Bergmann and Gershon Scholem. Among the government ministers who made their home in Rehavia were Dov Yosef and Yosef Burg.

Landmarks

Landmark buildings in Rehavia include the headquarters of the Jewish Agency for Israel, the windmill on Ramban Street, and the Ratisbonne Monastery.
Gymnasia Rehavia, the country's second modern high school (after Gymnasia Herzliya in Tel Aviv) was built on Keren Kayemet Street in 1928. Yitzhak Ben Zvi, who was to become the second president of Israel, and his future wife, Rachel Yanait, were teachers there.

In the center of historic Rehavia is Yad Ben-Zvi, a research institute established by Ben-Zvi. Jason's Tomb was discovered during construction work on Alfasi Street.

Street names
Most of Rehavia's streets are named after Jewish scholars and poets from the Golden Age of Jewish culture in Spain. Among them are Maimonides (Ben Maimon), Nachmanides (Ramban), Don Isaac Abarbanel, Abraham ibn Ezra, Hasdai ibn Shaprut, Isaac Alfasi, Rabbi David Kimhi (the Radak), Yehuda Alharizi, Shlomo ibn Aderet (the Rashba), Benjamin of Tudela, and Dunash ben Labrat. There are few exceptions, most notably Keren Kayemet Le'Israel (Jewish National Fund) Street and Ussishkin Street. In 1926, a street was named Keren Kayemet Le'Israel to honor the 25th year of the Jewish National Fund. In 1934, the Rehavia neighborhood council decided to change the name of this street to Rechov Ussishkin, and move Keren Kayemet Le'Israel Street to its present location.

Notable residents
Avraham Burg
Eliezer Igra
Emanuel Feldman
David Flusser
Haile Selassie, Emperor of Ethiopia
Moshe Goshen-Gottstein
Moshe Greenberg
Erich Mendelsohn
Benjamin Netanyahu (born 1949), Prime Minister
Menachem Ussishkin (1863-1941), Zionist leader and head of the Jewish National Fund
Berel Wein, rabbi
Daphni Leef, activist
Reuven Rivlin, President of Israel
Robert Aumann, Nobel prize winner
Miriam Naor, President of the Supreme Court of Israel

Gallery

References

External links

Rehavia residents in J'lem take on developers changing character of neighborhood

Ashkenazi Jewish culture in Jerusalem
German-Jewish culture in Jerusalem
Neighbourhoods of Jerusalem
 
Yekke